Imogen Toner is a British art director and actress of stage and screen.  Aside from appearances in multiple fringe plays including The Not So Fatal Death of Grandpa Fredo and more recognised works such as Casualty, Waterloo Road, River City and Snow White, and Around the World in 80 Days she is perhaps best known for her appearances in the Scottish thriller films The Inheritance (2007) and Dark Nature (2009).

Filmography

References

External links 
 
 Imogen Toner on Twitter

Living people
British actresses
British film actresses
British stage actresses
Year of birth missing (living people)